The 1900 Lafayette football team represented Lafayette College in the 1900 college football season. Lafayette shut out seven opponents and finished with a 9–2 record in their second year under head coach Samuel B. Newton. Significant games included victories over Lehigh (34–0 and 18–0), and Cornell (17–0), and losses to Princeton (0–5) and Penn (5–12).  The 1900 Lafayette team outscored its opponents by a combined total of 214 to 25.

Three Lafayette players received recognition on the 1900 College Football All-America Team. They are: center Walter E. Bachman (Caspar Whitney, 1st team); guard Trout (Whitney, 2nd team); and fullback David Dudley Cure (Walter Camp, 2nd team; deemed "ineligible" by Whitney).

Schedule

References

Lafayette
Lafayette Leopards football seasons
Lafayette football